John Dore Daly (13 December 1890 – 9 April 1968) was an Australian rules footballer who played with Melbourne in the Victorian Football League (VFL).

References

External links 

1890 births
Australian rules footballers from Victoria (Australia)
Melbourne Football Club players
1968 deaths